Fuegotrophon is a genus of sea snails, marine gastropod mollusks in the family Muricidae, the murex snails or rock snails.

Species
Species within the genus Fuegotrophon include:
 Fuegotrophon amettei (Carcelles, 1946)
 Fuegotrophon malvinarum (Strebel, 1908)
 Fuegotrophon pallidus (Broderip, 1833)

References

External links
 Powell A. W. B. (1951). Antarctic and Subantarctic Mollusca: Pelecypoda and Gastropoda. Discovery Reports, 26: 47-196, pl. 5-10